Barry Stewart can refer to:

 Barry Stewart (Australian cricketer) (1940-1975), Australian cricketer
 Barry Stewart (English cricketer) (born 1980), English cricketer
 Barry Stewart (rugby union) (born 1976), Scottish rugby union player